The fiery-breasted bushshrike (Malaconotus cruentus) is a species of bird in the family Malaconotidae.
It is found throughout the African tropical rainforest.
Its natural habitats are subtropical or tropical dry forest and subtropical or tropical moist lowland forest.

References

fiery-breasted bushshrike
Birds of the African tropical rainforest
fiery-breasted bushshrike
Taxonomy articles created by Polbot